Illusionistic tradition is a style of theatre that was created in Italy during the Renaissance. Its focus was primarily centered on grandiose spectacle in theatrical performance. Stages made use of Italianate scenery, including Proscenium arch, perspective, border flats, and a raked stage to create a visual image that had never before been used.

See also
Illusionism (art)
Mimesis

Theatrical genres